Nyron is a male given name. Notable people with this name include:

 Nyron Asgarali (1920–2006), West Indian cricket player
 Nyron Dyer (born 1989), Montserratian football player
 Nyron Nosworthy (born 1980), English-born Jamaican football player
 Nyron Wau (born 1982), Dutch football player